Franz is a German name and cognate of the given name Francis. Notable people named Franz include:

Nobility

Austria-Hungary 

 Francis I, Holy Roman Emperor (1708–1765)
 Francis II, Holy Roman Emperor (1768–1835), founder of the Austrian Empire
 Franz Joseph I (1830–1916), Austrian Emperor
 Franz Ferdinand, Archduke of Austria, heir to the thrones of Austria-Hungary, whose assassination in 1914 sparked World War I
 Franz Karl, Archduke of Austria (1802–1878), father of two emperors
 Franz Salvator, Archduke of Austria (1866–1939), Tuscan branch of the House of Habsburg
 Franz, Duke of Hohenberg (1927–1977), head of the House of Hohenburg
 Franz, Prince of Kohary (1760–1826), Imperial Chancellor
 Franz, Prince of Thun and Hohenstein (1847–1916), Governor of Bohemia
 Franz, Count of Deym (1838–1903), diplomat
 Franz, Count of Meran (1839–1891), Austrian Count
 Franz, Count of Gyulai (1798–1868), Governor of Lombardy-Venetia
 Franz, Count Széchényi (1754–1820), Hungarian Count
 Franz Anton von Kolowrat-Liebsteinsky (1778–1861), statesman from Prague
 Franz Conrad von Hötzendorf (1852–1925), Chief of the General Staff
 Franz Moritz von Lacy (1725–1801), Field Marshal
 Count Franz Philipp von Lamberg (1791–1848), soldier and statesman

Germany 

 Franz, Duke of Bavaria (born 1933), head of the House of Wittelsbach
 Franz, Duke of Saxe-Coburg-Saalfeld (1750–1806), member of the House of Wettin
 Prince Franz of Bavaria (1875–1957), member of the House of Wittelsbach
 Prince Franz-Josef of Bavaria (born 1957), member of the House of Wittelsbach
 Prince Franz Joseph of Thurn and Taxis (1893–1971), head of the House of Thurn and Taxis
 Prince Franz Wilhelm of Prussia (born 1943), member of the House of Hohenzollern
 Prince Franz Joseph of Battenberg (1861–1924), member of the House of Hesse
 Franz, Count of Erbach-Erbach (1754–1823), nobleman and art collector
 Franz von Waldeck (1491–1553), Prince-Bishop of Münster

Liechtenstein 

 Franz I, Prince of Liechtenstein (1853–1938), sovereign of Liechtenstein
 Franz Joseph I, Prince of Liechtenstein (1726–1781), sovereign of Liechtenstein
 Franz Joseph II, Prince of Liechtenstein (1906–1989), sovereign of Liechtenstein

Other people

A
 Franz Abt (1819–1885), German composer and Kapellmeister
 Franz Ackermann (born 1963), German painter and installation artist
 Franz Adam (1815–1886), German painter of military subjects
 Franz Alt (mathematician) (1910–2011), Austrian-born American mathematician and computer scientist

B
 Franz Anton Basch, Nazi executed for war crimes
 Franz Bauer (1748–1840), Austrian microscopist and botanist
 Franz Beckenbauer, German football player and manager
 Franz Behr (1837–1898), German composer
 Franz Benda (1709–1786), Czech violinist and composer
 Franz Berwald (1796–1868), Swedish composer
 Franz Beyer (general) (1892–1968), German General in World War II
 Franz Beyer (musicologist) (1922–2018), German musicologist
 Franz Beyer (pilot) (1918–1944), German fighter pilot
 Franz Binder (1911–1989), Austrian football player and coach
 Franz Boas (1858–1942), German-American anthropologist considered the "Father of American anthropology"
 Franz Boos (1753–1832), Austrian botanist and explorer during the Enlightenment
 Franz Bopp (1791–1867), German linguist
 Franz Brunner (handballer) (1913–1991), Austrian handball player who competed in the 1936 Summer Olympics
 Franz Burda I (1903–1986), German publisher
 Franz Büchner (pathologist) (1895–1991), German pathologist
 Franz Bürkl, Gestapo officer in Nazi-occupied Poland, assassinated in Operation Bürkl

C
 Franz Calustro, Bolivian football player

D
 Franz Defregger (1835–1921), Austrian painter
 Franz Josef Degenhardt (1931–2011), German poet, novelist and singer-songwriter
 Franz-Benno Delonge (1957–2007), designer of German-style board games
 Franz von Dingelstedt (1814–1881), German poet, dramatist, theatre administrator

E
 Franz Engel (1834–1920), German explorer

F
 Franz Joseph Feuchtmayer (1660–1718), German artist, patriarch of the Feuchtmayer family
 Franz Xaver Feuchtmayer the Elder (1698–1763), German Baroque artist and plasterer
 Franz Xaver Feuchtmayer the Younger (1735–1803), German Baroque artist and plasterer
 Franz Fuchs (1949–2000), Austrian terrorist

G
 Franz Grillparzer (1791–1872), Austrian writer and poet

H
 Franz Halberg (1919–2013), one of the founders of chronobiology
 Franz Hein (1892–1976), German chemist
 Franz von Hipper (1863–1932), German World War I admiral, commander of High Seas Fleet
 Franz Hofmeister (1850–1922), German protein scientist
 Franz Hössler (1906–1945), Nazi officer at Auschwitz executed for war crimes

J
 Franz Jägerstätter (1907–1943), Austrian conscientious objector during World War II
 Franz Josef Jung (born 1949), German politician

K
 Franz Kafka (1883–1924), Bohemian novelist
 Franz Kindermann, German merchant
 Franz Klammer (born 1953), champion Austrian alpine ski racer
 Franz Kleffner (1907–1945), SS officer in World War II
 Franz Kline (1910–1962), American abstract painter
 Franz Konrad (SS officer) (1906–1952), German SS officer executed for war crimes
 Franz König (1905–2004), Austrian Cardinal of the Catholic Church

L
 Franz Lachner (1803–1890), German composer and conductor
 Franz Langoth (1877–1953), Austrian nationalist politician
 Franz Lehár (1870–1948), Austrian composer
 Franz Lidz (born 1951), American writer and journalist
 Franz Liszt (1811–1886), Hungarian composer and piano virtuoso

M
 Franz Machon (1918–1968), German sailor in World War II and sole survivor of U-512
 Franz Marc (1880–1916), principal painter of the German Expressionist movement
 Franz Marek (1913–1979), Austrian communist politician
 Franz Erdmann Mehring (1846–1919), German publicist, politician and historian
 Franz Müntefering (born 1940), German politician and industrialist

N
 Franz Nachbaur (1835–1902), German opera tenor
 Franz Xaver Nachtmann (1799–1846), German painter

P
 Franz von Papen (1879–1969), Chancellor of Germany in the Weimar Republic

R
 Franz Rademacher (1906–1973), Nazi diplomat and author of the Madagascar Plan
 Franz Reichleitner (1906–1944), Austrian Nazi SS concentration camp commander
 Franz Rosenzweig (1886–1929), German-Jewish theologian and philosopher

S
 Franz Schafheitlin (1895–1980), German film actor
 Franz Schalk (1863–1931), Austrian conductor and founder of the Salzburg Music Festival
 Franz Schall (1918–1945), German World War II fighter ace
 Franz Schieß (1921–1943), German World War II fighter ace
 Franz Scholz (1909–1998), German priest and theologian
 Franz von Paula Schrank (1747–1835), German botanist and entomologist
 Franz Schubert (1797–1828), Austrian composer
 Franz Heinrich Schwechten (1841–1924), German architect
 Franz Schwede (1888–1960), Nazi Gaulieter of Pomerania
 Franz Schädle (1906–1945), commander of Adolf Hitler's personal bodyguard
 Franz Wilhelm Seiwert (1894–1933), German constructivist painter and sculptor
 Franz Joseph Spiegler (1691–1757), German Baroque painter
 Franz Stangl (1908-1971), Austrian-born Nazi SS concentration camp commandant
 Franz Stofel (1915–1945), German Nazi concentration camp commander executed for war crimes
 Franz Josef Strauss (1915–1988), German politician 
 Franz von Suppé (1819–1895), Austrian composer
 Franz Xaver Süssmayr (1766–1803), Austrian composer

T
 Franz Taurinus (1794–1874), German mathematician
 Franz Thonner (1863–1928), Austrian taxonomist and botanist
 Franz Treichler, Swiss rock musician and singer of The Young Gods

U
 Franz Unger (1800–1870), Austrian botanist, paleontologist and plant physiologist

V
 Franz Vranitzky (born 1937), Austrian politician

W
 Franz Werfel, (1890–1945), Austrian-Bohemian novelist, playwright and poet

Z
 Franz Ziereis (1905–1945), German Nazi SS concentration camp commandant

Fictional characters 
 Franz, a German enemy character in the 1989 video game Human Killing Machine
 Hans and Franz, characters of the television show Saturday Night Live
 Franz Bibfeldt, fictitious theologian and in-joke among American academic theologian
 Dr. Franz Eldemann, character from House of Dracula
 Franz Heinel, character in the Japanese anime series Future GPX Cyber Formula
 Franz Hopper, character from the French-produced animated series Code Lyoko
 Franz Kemmerich, character in the war novel All Quiet on the Western Front
 Franz Liebkind, character in The Producers
 Franz Oberhauser, James Bond character professionally known as Ernst Stavro Blofeld
 Franz Sanchez, character in the 1989 James Bond film Licence to Kill
 Franz, guard in Franz Kafka's novel The Trial
 Baron Franz d'Épinay, friend of Albert de Morcerf in Alexandre Dumas's novel The Count of Monte Cristo

See also 
 Frans (disambiguation)
 Franz (disambiguation)
 Frantz (disambiguation)
 Franz Ferdinand (disambiguation)

References

Masculine given names
German masculine given names

an:Francisco
ca:Francesc
cs:Franz
cs:František
et:Franz
es:Franz
eo:Francisko
fr:Franz
ko:프란츠
id:Franz
it:Franz
la:Franciscus
nl:Frans (voornaam)
ja:フランツ
no:Francisco
nn:Frans
pl:Franciszek
pt:Franz
sk:František
sl:Franc
fi:François
sv:Franciscus